is an English contract law case, concerning how it will be judged whether an agreement is reached.

Facts
Molkerei was buying automated packaging machinery, to come from and be installed by RTS. They made a letter of intent, providing for the whole contract price, contemplating full contract terms would be based on MF/1 terms, i.e. using the Institute of Engineering and Technology's model form of contract for the design, supply and installation of electrical, electronic and mechanical plant. On 5 July 2005, a draft final contract was produced, which stated that it would not be effective until executed and exchanged. Work began anyway. On 25 August terms were varied. There was a dispute about which terms the contract was on.

The Judge held that after the letter of intent expired, they entered a contract for RTS to do the work for an agreed price, but that did not include the final draft version of the MF/1 terms. The Court of Appeal held no contract arose after the letter of intent expiry at all. Molkerei argued there was a contract of expiry, not on the MF/1 terms, and RTS argued there was no contract, or if there was it was on MF/1 terms, as amended through the negotiations.

Judgment
Lord Clarke held that it was too dogmatic to say the "subject to contract" terms would be the ones that were binding, because it always depends on the circumstances. They had reached a binding agreement on or about 25 August on the terms agreed on or before 5 July as subsequently varied, and that the agreement was not subject to contract. This case illustrated the perils of beginning work without a precise basis for payment.

See also

UK labour law

References

English contract case law
Supreme Court of the United Kingdom cases
2010 in case law
2010 in British law